The Riverside Community College District, or RCCD, is the community college district serving Riverside, California, United States, and neighboring cities. It is part of the California Community Colleges System. The California Community College system is a part of the state's three-tier public higher education system, which also includes the University of California system and California State University system.

RCCD consists of following:

Three two-year, associate's degree-awarding campuses:
 Riverside City College
 Moreno Valley College
 Norco College

Three specialized training campuses:
 Ben Clark Training Center (Law Enforcement / Fire Safety)
 Riverside County Culinary Academy
 Riverside School for the Arts

Two annex / learning centers:
 Rubidoux Annex
 Innovation Learning Center

One museum:
 Center for Social Justice and Civil Liberties

References

External links 
 Riverside Community College District
 The Logistics Management Program
 Ben Clark Public Safety Training Center

California Community Colleges
Educational institutions established in 1916
Education in Riverside, California
Universities and colleges in Riverside County, California
1916 establishments in California